The Ark is the sixth serial of the third season of the British science fiction television series Doctor Who, which was first broadcast in four weekly parts from 5 to 26 March 1966.

The serial is set at least ten million years in the far distant future. In the first two episodes the time traveller the First Doctor (William Hartnell) and his travelling companions Steven Taylor (Peter Purves) and Dodo Chaplet (Jackie Lane) arrive on a generation ship that Dodo names "the Ark". The Doctor searches for a cure for a fever that has spread across the human and Monoid races on board the ship, who have no immunity to it. The last two episodes are set 700 years later, and involve the Doctor, Steven and Dodo working with the Refusian race to stop the Monoids from wiping out the last of humanity with a bomb.

The story constitutes Dodo's first journey as a companion to the Doctor. It is also the earliest serial of the third season to exist in its entirety.

Plot

At least ten million years in the future the TARDIS materialises on a vast spacecraft with its own miniature zoo and arboretum. The First Doctor and Steven are explaining the basics of their time travel ability to their new companion Dodo Chaplet when she starts to show signs of a cold. The three are taken to the control chamber of the vessel by the mute single-eyed Monoids. The Monoids live in peace alongside the humans who command the spaceship, their own planet having been destroyed, but they often do much of the menial work. The humans explain that the Earth is about to be destroyed because of the expansion of the Sun, and that the ship is an "Ark" sent into space with the last remnants of humanity, civilisation, and various flora and fauna. The human Guardians in charge of the craft run a tight ship: failure to conform to their rules means either death or miniaturisation until they reach their destination, an Earth-like planet called Refusis II, which takes nearly 700 years to get to. As an amusement during the journey a vast statue is being carved by hand, depicting a human being.

Dodo's cold spreads among the Monoid and human populations, who have little natural immunity. When the Commander of the Ark collapses with the malady Zentos, the Deputy Commander, assumes that the travellers have deliberately infected the ship and places the whole ship on alert. After a trial, during which Steven collapses with the fever, Zentos orders the execution of the Doctor, Steven and Dodo, but the ailing Commander intervenes to protect them and permits them access to medical equipment to devise a cure. The Doctor is able to recreate the cold vaccine from the membranes of animals on the craft, and this is administered to the crew. The Commander, Steven and the others who have been infected are soon on the road to recovery. Their work done, the trio observe the end of Earth on the long-range scanner before the Doctor leads them back to the TARDIS.

The TARDIS rematerialises back on the Ark, but 700 years later. They learn that after a second wave of the cold virus introduced a genetic weakness into the humans the Monoids staged a coup and took control. They have completed the statue in the image of themselves, and now have voice communicators and use numerical emblems to distinguish each other. The surviving humans are now the Monoids' slaves, and the Doctor and his friends are sent to the kitchen to help to prepare meals for the Monoids. Two humans, Venussa and Dassuk, believe that the moment of their liberation is at hand. Steven tries to help them in a revolt, which is unsuccessful.

The arrival on Refusis is close at hand and a landing pod is prepared. Monoid 1 wants to make sure that the new world is inhabited only by Monoids, despite promises that the human population will be allowed to live there too. A landing party is assembled—the Doctor, Dodo, Monoid 2 and a subject Guardian named Yendom—and they soon reach Refusis II and start to investigate. A stately castle, which seems to be empty, is in fact occupied by the Refusians, giant beings rendered invisible by solar flares.  Having anticipated the arrival of the Ark, they built the castle to accommodate the colonists. They welcome their guests, but want to share the planet only with other peaceful beings. Monoid 2 and Yendom flee the castle, and en route Yendom realises that the humans will not be allowed to reach Refusis with the Monoids. Monoid 2 kills him and shortly afterwards is killed himself when the Refusians destroy the lander.

Monoid 1 decides to colonise Refusis without more checks on the planet, but once they land and discover the destroyed landing pod other, more cautious, Monoids revolt, sparking a civil war. The Doctor, Dodo and a Refusian use the confusion to steal one of the launchers and send the Refusian back to the Ark.

The Monoids have placed a bomb on board the ship and plan to evacuate soon to the planet, leaving the humans to die. Word of this threat spreads and spurs a human rebellion. They discover that the bomb has been placed in the head of the statue, which the Refusian helps to dispose of into space before the bomb explodes. The humans now begin to land on Refusis themselves, having been offered support by the Refusians on the condition that they live peacefully with the remaining Monoids.

Shortly after the TARDIS departs the Doctor becomes invisible in the TARDIS control room.

Production
Although Lesley Scott is credited as a co-writer, she does not appear to have done any actual work on the scripts. Her then-husband, Paul Erickson, requested that she be given a credit, but her name appears on no other related documents. A Lesley Scott was credited as a contributor to the Dr. Who Annuals published by World Distributors/World International, but it is not clear whether this is the same person.

The Monoids were played by actors, each holding a ping-pong ball in his mouth to represent the alien's single eye. The upper portion of the actor's face was hidden by a wig.

Cast notes
Roy Spencer later played Frank Harris in Fury from the Deep (1968). Terence Bayler later played Major Barrington in The War Games (1969). Australian actor Bill Hunter played one of the Guardians; however, he remained uncredited.

Richard Beale, who provided the disembodied voice of the invisible Refusian, later played Bat Masterson in The Gunfighters (1966).

Michael Sheard made the first of six appearances in Doctor Who; he subsequently appeared in The Mind of Evil (1971) with Jon Pertwee, Pyramids of Mars (1975) and The Invisible Enemy (1977) with Tom Baker, Castrovalva (1982) with Peter Davison and Remembrance of the Daleks (1988) with Sylvester McCoy.

Broadcast and reception

Reviewing the serial in 2009, Patrick Mulkern of Radio Times stated, "The concept is fine, especially with the time-lapse cliffhanger to episode two ... Otherwise the plot is lacking in dramatic incident and there are often tracts of extreme tedium." He felt that the Guardians did not have enough time to develop and called the Monoids "somewhat ludicrous", though he did praise the direction, music, and effects. DVD Talk's John Sinnott gave the serial three and a half out of four stars, writing that the first half was "slow" but became interesting when the TARDIS crew returned. Arnold T. Blumberg of IGN rated the serial an eight out of ten, highlighting the "snappy and exciting" pace and the "surprisingly top-notch" production values, aside from the Monoids. SFX reviewer Ian Berriman rated it three out of five stars, describing it as "quaint" with the Monoids being "laughable" villains. However, he did note the ambition of the story, that it was faster-paced than others at the time, and the "positively epic" sets. Brian J. Robb of Dreamwatch praised the direction but wrote that the "ambitious story that fails miserably thanks to the less-than-stellar Monoids". Charlie Jane Anders of io9 listed the cliffhanger of "The Plague"—in which the TARDIS crew leave and return in the future—as one of the greatest Doctor Who cliffhangers in a 2010 article.

Commercial releases

In print

A novelisation of this serial, written by Paul Erickson, was published by Target Books in October 1986.

Home media
This story was released on VHS, in 1998. It was later released on CD with linking narration by Peter Purves. The CD also includes an interview with Peter about this story and his time on Doctor Who. This CD is available as an audio book on the iTunes Store.

The Ark was released on DVD on 14 February 2011 in region 2, and on 8 March 2011 in region 1.

References

External links

Target novelisation

Doctor Who serials novelised by Paul Erickson
First Doctor serials
1966 British television episodes
Fiction set in the 7th millennium or beyond